The 2013–14 Prva A liga is the 8th season of the Prva A liga, Serbia's premier Water polo league.

Team information

The following 8 clubs compete in the Prva A liga during the 2013–14 season:

Regular season

Standings

Pld - Played; W - Won; L - Lost; PF - Points for; PA - Points against; Diff - Difference; Pts - Points.

Schedule and results

Championship Playoff 
Teams in bold won the playoff series. Numbers to the left of each team indicate the team's original playoff seeding. Numbers to the right indicate the score of each playoff game.

Semifinals

1st leg

2nd leg

Crvena zvezda won series 2–0 and advanced to Final.

Radnički Kragujevac won series 2–0 and advanced to Final.

Final

1st leg

2nd leg

3rd leg

Crvena zvezda won Championship final series 3–0.

Team Roster
1 Denis Šefik, 2 Strahinja Rašović, 3 Nikola Rađen, 4 Petar Ivošević, 5 Filip Kljajević, 6 Nikola Vukčević, 7 Marko Avramović, 8 Viktor Rašović, 9 Sava Ranđelović, 10 Boris Vapenski, 11 Andrija Prlainović, 12 John Mann, 13 Marko Draksimović and 14 Mihajlo Milićević

Coach: Dejan Savić

Third Place

Partizan Raiffeisen won series 2–0 and won the Third Place

Play-off

References

External links
 Serbian Water Polo Federaration 

Seasons in Serbian water polo competitions
Serbia
Prva A liga
Prva A liga
2013 in water polo
2014 in water polo